The Finger of Og, King of Bashan, is the name given to a huge stone pillar, sometimes called Herod's Pillar, which lies in front of the Russian Compound in  Jerusalem.

Its upper surface is partially dressed and the discovery of a flaw appears to be the reason it was abandoned and left in-situ.

See also
Levantine archaeology

References

Classical sites in Jerusalem
Russian Compound